The Boys in the Band may refer to:

Play and its adaptations
 The Boys in the Band (play), a 1968 play by Mart Crowley
The Boys in the Band (1970 film), an adaption directed by William Friedkin
The Boys in the Band (2020 film), an adaptation directed by Joe Mantello

Music
 Boys in the Band (album), by Long John Baldry, 1980
 Boys in the Band (video), by the Libertines, 2004
 Boys in the Band, an album by Vodka Collins, 2004
 "The Boys in the Band", a song by Gentle Giant from Octopus, 1972
 "Boys in the Band", a song by Mountain from Climbing!, 1970
 "Boys in the Band (Boy Band Anthem)", a song by New Kids on the Block, 2019

Television episodes
 "Boys in the Band" (The Fairly OddParents), 2002
 "The Boys in the Band" (Family Guy), 2016
 "Boys in the Band" (Given), 2019
 "The Boys in the Band" (Step by Step), 1992

See also